COMBATPAC was the title, from 1922 to 1944, of the United States Navy officer who commanded the battleships of the larger United States Battle Fleet in the Pacific (Commander, Battleships, Pacific).

When formed in 1922, the Battle Fleet (renamed Battle Force in 1930 and Pacific Fleet in 1941), included various type commands.  The battleship type was led by the COMBATPAC, generally a three-star vice admiral or two-star rear admiral. The COMBATPAC had five rear admirals (lower half) reporting to him, each leading a Battleship Division of four ships.

In late 1944, the battleships was reorganized into two type commands, each led by a vice admiral.  Battleships Squadron One consisted of the Old Battleships, while Battleship Squadron Two consisted of the Fast Battleships.

Commanders

Former Commanders, Battleships, Battle Fleet (Commander, Battleship Divisions, Battle Fleet)
Vice Admiral William R. Shoemaker, USN (1922)
Vice Admiral Henry A. Wiley, USN (20 June 1923 - 26 August 1925)
Vice Admiral Richard H. Jackson, USN (5 October 1925 - 4 September 1926)
Vice Admiral Louis R. de Steiguer, USN (1926-1927)
Vice Admiral William V. Pratt, USN (1927-1928)
Vice Admiral Louis M. Nulton, USN (26 June 1928 - 21 May 1929)
Vice Admiral Lucius A. Bostwick, USN (May 1929 - May 1930)

Former Commanders, Battleships, Battle Force
Vice Admiral Richard H. Leigh, USN (May 1930-1931)
Vice Admiral Luke McNamee, USN (1931-1932)
Vice Admiral David F. Sellers, USN (1932-1933)
Vice Admiral Joseph M. Reeves, USN (June 1933- 1 July 1933)
Vice Admiral Walton R. Sexton, USN (1934)
Vice Admiral William D. Leahy, USN (1935-1936)
Vice Admiral Clarence S. Kempff, USN (30 March 1936 - 2 January 1937)
Vice Admiral Edward C. Kalbfus, USN (2 January 1937 - 29 January 1938)
Vice Admiral John W. Greenslade, USN (29 January 1938 to 20 May 1939)
Vice Admiral Charles P. Snyder (admiral), USN   (1939 - January 1940)
Vice Admiral William S. Pye, USN (January 1940 - January 1941)
Rear Admiral Walter S. Anderson, USN (January 1941 - 10 April 1942)

Former Commanders, Battleships, Pacific Fleet

Rear Admiral Walter S. Anderson, USN (10 April 1942 - 28 September 1942)
Vice Admiral Herbert Fairfax Leary, USN (28 September 1942 - 16 April 1943)
Vice Admiral Willis Augustus Lee, USN (16 April 1943 - 15 December 1944)

Former Commanders, Battleship Squadrons, Pacific Fleet

Squadron One

Vice Admiral Jesse B. Oldendorf, USN (15 December 1944 - 2 September 1945)

Squadron Two

 Vice Admiral Willis A. Lee, USN (15 December 1944 - 25 August 1945)
 Rear Admiral John F. Shafroth Jr., USN (25 August 1945 - 2 September 1945)

See also

 Battleships in World War II
 History of United States Naval Operations in World War II
 Further information on Battleship Divisions (BatDiv)

References

 Battle Force of 1940 
 Change of Command announced for 1937 
 Report of Commander, Battleships, Battle Force following the attack on Pearl Harbor 
1941-1945 Commander, Battleships, Pacific list 
1945 Organization of the US Pacific Fleet, US Navy History and Heritage Command 
1934 Photo of US Fleet Staff, VADM Walton Sexton included 
 Battleships, Battle Force, U.S. Fleet, Commander Vice Admiral Greenslade and Staff, circa 1938 photo, US Navy History and Heritage Command 
US Navy Biography of Vice Admiral Willis A. Lee, Jr. 
US Navy Biography of Admiral Jesse B. Oldendorf 
US Navy Photo of Vice Admiral Leahy as Commander, Battleships, Battle Force 1938 
US Navy Photo of Vice Admiral Leahy and Battleships, Battle Force Staff 
US Navy Photo of Vice Admiral Clarence S. Kempff assuming command of Battleships, Battle force 
US Navy Photo of Vice Admiral Davis F. Sellers and Battleships, Battle Force Staff 1933  
US Navy Biography of Admiral Louis M. Nulton, USN (Retired)

US Navy Photo Vice Admiral H. A. Wiley, USN as Commander, Battleships 
US Navy Biography of Admiral Henry A. Wiley, USN (Retired) 
US Navy Biography of Admiral Louis Rudolph De Steiguer 
US Navy Biography of Admiral Joseph M. Reeves, USN (Retired) 
VADM W.R. Shoemaker, Commander Battleships 1922 listed in Army-Navy Register Defense Times 
VADM William R. Shoemaker listed as Commander, Battleships 1922 in Our Navy, the Standard Publication of the U.S. Navy, Volume 16 
1940 New York Times Obituary of Admiral Lucius A. Bostwick 
NH 55465 Admiral William V. Pratt, Admiral Louis McCoy Nulton, and Vice Admiral Lucius A. Bostwick Photo   
 Admiral William V. Pratt, USN, Commander-in-Chief, U. S. Fleet (left); Admiral Louis McCoy Nulton, USN, Commander-in-Chief, Battle Fleet (center); and Vice Admiral Lucius A. Bostwick, USN, Commander Battleship Divisions, Battle Fleet, on a battleship, circa 1930 photo.  
US Navy History and Heritage Command DANFS information on USS Bostwick (DE-103), which includes biographical information and service summary for Vice Admiral Lucius A. Bostwick 

BatPac
Battleship units and formations of the United States Navy